The Gibraltar national under-21 football team represents Gibraltar in football competitions at under-21 level and is controlled by the Gibraltar Football Association. It is  a full member of FIFA and is therefore  eligible to enter any FIFA-sanctioned tournaments.  Gibraltar applied for full UEFA membership and was accepted by the UEFA Congress in May 2013 and can therefore compete in the UEFA European Under-21 Championship beginning with the 2015 edition of the tournament, although they did not participate until 2017, in qualification for the 2019 UEFA European Under-21 Championship.

UEFA Acceptance
Since being accepted into UEFA in May 2013, they have not formed under-21 team, until announcement in December 2016. The Gibraltar Football Association announced that Gibraltar will be participating in the UEFA European Under-21 Championship for the first time as from 2017 with qualifying games for the 2019 UEFA European Under-21 Championship, that will take place in Italy. The draw for the qualifiers was in Switzerland on 26 January 2017 and Gibraltar will play in Group 7.

They played their first ever international on 8 June 2017, against Austria, losing 3–0. After losing their next 4 games without scoring, the Gibraltar U21 team secured a historic 1–0 win over Macedonia on 10 October 2017, with a goal from captain Graeme Torrilla meaning that Gibraltar earned their first competitive win at any level since joining UEFA.

Competition history

UEFA European Under-21 Football Championship

Record of matches
The following table shows Gibraltar under-21s all-time international record, correct as of 14 June 2022. Only official matches are included.

{| class="sortable wikitable plainrowheaders" style="text-align:center"
|-
!scope=col|Opponents
!scope=col width=30|
!scope=col width=30|
!scope=col width=30|
!scope=col width=30|
!scope=col width=30|
!scope=col width=30|
!scope=col width=30|
!scope=col width=30|
!scope=col width=40|
!scope=col width=40|
|-
!scope=row|

|2017 || 2017
|-
!scope=row|

|2017 || 2018
|-
!scope=row|

|2019 || 2019
|-
!scope=row|

|2021 || 2022
|-
!scope=row|

|2019 || 2019
|-
!scope=row|

|2021 || 2022
|-
!scope=row|

|2019 || 2022
|-
!scope=row|

|2017 || 2018
|-
!scope=row|

|2020 || 2020
|-
!scope=row|

|2019 || 2020
|-
!scope=row|

|2017 || 2018
|-
!scope=row|

|2017 || 2018
|-
!scope=row|

|2021 || 2021
|-
!scope=row|

|2021 || 2022
|- class="sortbottom"
!scope=row|Total

!2017 !! 2022
|}

2023 UEFA European Under-21 Football Championship qualification

Matches

Players

Current squad
For the 2023 UEFA European Under-21 Championship qualification and finals, players born on or after 1 January 2000 are eligible.

The following players were called up for the following 2023 UEFA European Under-21 Championship qualifiers:
 Match date: 7–14 June 2022
 Opposition: ,  and 
 Caps and goals correct as of: 14 June 2022, after the match against .

Names in bold denote players who have been capped for the senior team.

Recent call-ups
The following players have been called up within the past twelve months or withdrew from the current squad due to injury or suspension, and remain eligible.

INJ Withdrew from the squad due to an injury
PRE Preliminary squad
WD  Withdrew for other reasons

Gibraltar under-21 managers
Up to date as of 14 June 2022

Note: Michael Felice served as caretaker manager in late 2020 while David Ochello was on personal leave.

Personnel

Current technical staff
As of 20 March 2019

Player records

Most capped
As of 14 June 2022

Most goals
As of 14 June 2022

Players with an equal number of goals are ranked in order of average.

Captains
As of 14 June 2022

Goalkeepers
As of 14 June 2022

 Players in bold are still actively competing and are available for selection

See also 
 Football in Gibraltar
 Gibraltar Football Association

References

External links
Official site of the Gibraltar Football Association
Unofficial website about Gibraltarian football, futsal and national team

European national under-21 association football teams
under-21